This list comprises players who have appeared in Negro league baseball.

Complete list of players 

The complete list is divided into four pages to reduce the size:

List of Negro league baseball players (A–D)
List of Negro league baseball players (E–L)
List of Negro league baseball players (M–R)
List of Negro league baseball players (S–Z)

Selected list of players 

The players below are some of the most notable of those who played Negro league baseball, beginning with the codification of baseball's color line barring African American players (about 1892), past the re-integration  in 1946 of the sport, up until the Negro leagues finally expired about 1962. Members of the Baseball Hall of Fame are noted with a β.  Names of those who played in integrated organized white leagues are boldfaced, and those who played in integrated major leagues are also italicized.

Pre-Negro leagues (1877–1919) 
They played primarily before the organized Negro leagues. Among them Fowler, Frank Grant, George Stovey, and Fleet Walker were notable players especially during the 1880s, before complete segregation.

Negro leagues era I (1920–1934) 
They played most of their careers in the organized Negro leagues before the Great Depression.

Negro leagues era II (1935–1949) 
They played most of their careers in the organized Negro leagues after the Great Depression.

Post-integration (1950–1962) 
They played during the decline of the Negro leagues, after the beginning of integration.

See also

List of first black MLB players by team and date
Hall of Fame candidates 2006

References
List of player profiles from the Negro Leagues Baseball eMuseum

Negro